Woodbury may refer to:

Geography

Antarctica
Woodbury Glacier, a glacier on Graham Land, British Antarctic Territory

Australia
Woodbury, Tasmania, a locality in Australia

England
Woodbury, Bournemouth, an area in Dorset
Woodbury, East Devon, a village and civil parish in East Devon
Woodbury Castle, a hillfort near the village of Woodbury in Devon
Woodbury, Stoke Fleming, South Hams, Devon
Little Woodbury, an archaeological site near Salisbury in Wiltshire
 Woodbury Hill, Worcestershire, the site of the declaration of Worcestershire's Clubmen in the first English Civil War

New Zealand 
 Woodbury, New Zealand, a village near Geraldine in Canterbury

United States 
Woodbury, Connecticut
Woodbury, Georgia
Woodbury, Indiana
Woodbury, Irvine, California
Woodbury, Kentucky
Woodbury, Illinois
Woodbury, Michigan
Woodbury, Minnesota
Woodbury, New Jersey
Woodbury station
Woodbury, New York (disambiguation)
Woodbury, Nassau County, New York, on Long Island
Woodbury, Orange County, New York, in the Hudson Valley
Woodbury, Pennsylvania
Woodbury, Tennessee
Woodbury, Vermont
Woodbury County, Iowa
Woodbury (Leetown, West Virginia), historic house listed on the National Register of Historic Places
Woodbury Creek, a stream in Minnesota
Fort Woodbury, a fortification on the Arlington Line during the American Civil War

Fictional
Woodbury, Georgia - the settlement presided over by The Governor in The Walking Dead franchise

People

People with the given name Woodbury
 Woodbury Kane (1859–1905), American yachtsman, bon vivant and soldier
 Woodbury Langdon (1739–1805), American merchant, statesman and justice

People with the surname Woodbury
 Angus M. Woodbury (1886–1964), American biologist
 Austin Woodbury (1899–1979), Australian Catholic philosopher
 Bruce L. Woodbury (born 1944), American politician and lawyer
 Charles Herbert Woodbury (1864–1942), American painter
 Charles Johnson Woodbury (1844–1927), American lecturer on poetry and literature
Charles L. Woodbury (1820–1898), American lawyer and politician
 Cliff Woodbury (1894–1984), American racecar driver
 Daniel Phineas Woodbury (1812–1864), American soldier and engineer
 Dixon M. Woodbury (1921–1991) American epilepsy researcher
 Egburt E. Woodbury (c. 1860–1920), New York State Attorney General 1915–1917
 Ellen Woodbury, animator and sculptor
 Eri D. Woodbury (1837–1928), Union Army officer during the American Civil War
 Frank B. Woodbury (1867–1962), American leader The Church of Jesus Christ of Latter-day Saints
 Gordon Woodbury (1863–1924), United States Assistant Secretary of the Navy from 1920 to 1921
 Hanni Woodbury, German-American linguist and anthropologist
 Isaac B. Woodbury (1819–1858), American composer and publisher of church music
 Joan Woodbury (1915–1989), American actress
 Levi Woodbury (1789–1851), American Associate Justice on the United States Supreme Court
 Max A. Woodbury, American mathematician
 Peter Woodbury (1899–1970), American judge
 Richard Woodbury (born 1961), American politician and economist
 Tory Woodbury (born 1978), American football player
 Urban A. Woodbury (1838–1915), American politician
 Walter B. Woodbury (1834–1885), British inventor and pioneering photographer
 Wendall Woodbury (1942–2010), American television journalist and news anchor
 Woody Woodbury (born 1924), American comedian, actor and television personality

Other uses
, one of several ships of the United States Navy

See also
Woodbury Common (disambiguation)
Woodbury High School (disambiguation)
Woodbury House (disambiguation)
Woodbury Township (disambiguation)
Woodbury College, Montpelier, Vermont, United States
Woodbury Common Premium Outlets in Central Valley, New York, United States (part of the town of Woodbury, Orange County)
Woodbury matrix identity, a mathematical formula
Woodbury Soap Company
Woodbury University, Burbank, California, United States